The Emrax 2 is a Slovenian electric motor for powering electric aircraft and other applications, designed and produced by Emrax d.o.o of Kamnik. The company was formerly called Enstroj and based in Radomlje.

By May 2018 the engine was no longer advertised on the company website and seems to be out of production.

Design and development
The Emrax 2 is a brushless 200 Volt design, producing , with an outrunner coil. It has a 94% efficiency. The low working rpm of the engine means that it can turn a propeller at efficient speeds without the need for a reduction drive.

Variants
Emrax 2 AC
Air-cooled version, producing  at 3000 rpm.
Emrax 2 LC
Liquid-cooled version, producing  at 3000 rpm.

Specifications (Emrax 2 AC)

See also

References

Aircraft electric engines